Bailey Patrick is an English actor known for playing bad boy Mike Rendon in the British soap opera EastEnders and taking a lead role as DC Rob in the BBC television series London Kills (2019) and as Callum in the BBC One television drama series The Nest (2020).

Career
Patrick was born and raised in London, he studied at the University of Salford alongside such contemporaries as Dan "the grass" Rees and Michael Fox who co-presented The Dan and Mike Show on Manchester radio online. He subsequently took a BA Hons Acting at Rose Bruford College and also trained at RADA.

Film

Television

Theatre

References

External links
 
 

Alumni of Rose Bruford College
21st-century English male actors
20th-century English male actors
English male film actors
English male television actors
Living people
Year of birth missing (living people)